"Whatchulookinat" is a 2002 single released by American R&B/pop singer Whitney Houston. The song serves as the initial single from Houston's fifth studio album, Just Whitney.   "Whatchulookinat" has several remixes from Thunderpuss, Full Intention, Junior Vasquez, Peter Rauhofer, Razor 'N Guido and P. Diddy.

The song was seen as an attack on the media for the negative attention it gave to her life at the time.

Composition

"Whatchulookinat" was produced by Bobby Brown and Muhammad 2G and written by Whitney Houston, Andre Lewis, Tammie Harris, Jerry Muhammad.

The song was Houston's response to what she felt was intense and sometimes unfair and inaccurate media criticism at the time. "My following is real strong/ Try so hard to show the whole world what I do/ Now I'm turnin' the cameras back on you/ Same spotlights that once gave me fame/ Tryin' to dirty up Whitney's name," Houston sings. She then laments about people who've been "messing with [her] reputation" and "concentration" and don't "even have no education" on the chorus, singing, "I feel your eyes on me/ You been telling lies on me".

Critical reception

The criticism was generally negative. Billboard magazine said, "This song co-produced by Bobby Brown and co-authored by Houston herself - comes across like a poor little rich girl whining. That's just boring.." Rolling Stone said that the song was "creaky and unconvincing." The Guardian wrote that on the song Houston "puts on in a bravura performance" while "sounding feisty".

Chart performance
The single became a moderate success worldwide, peaking inside the top forty in most countries. The single performed strongly in some international markets; reaching number 3 in Canada, number 6 in Belgium, number 7 in Italy and number 13 in the United Kingdom. In the US, it became her tenth Hot Dance Club Play topper. The single peaked at #96 on the Billboard Hot 100.

Music video
The corresponding music video directed by Kevin Bray was also considered as Houston's answer to the media for getting too deep into her personal life. During the introduction, actor/comedian Mike Epps plays an overzealous paparazzi photographers/fan who harasses Whitney as she exits the studio with Faith Evans. The inside of Epps' camera served as the fictional location of the video. The video showed a white set with cameras all over, following Houston's every move. The set was also full with old movie cameras and people dressed as reporters and photographers. Houston is shown dancing in front of them. Future Migos member Offset appears as a young background dancer.

Track listings and formats

US promo CD
 "Whatchulookinat" (album version) – 3:35
 "Whatchulookinat" (instrumental) – 3:33

US vinyl 12"
A1 "Whatchulookinat" (album version) – 3:35
A2 "Whatchulookinat" (instrumental) – 3:33
B1 "Whatchulookinat" (album version) – 3:35
B2 "Whatchulookinat" (a cappella) – 3:33

US 2×12" promo (Thunderpuss Remixes)
A "Whatchulookinat" (Thunderpuss Anthem) – 11:53
B "Whatchulookinat" (Thunderpuss Club Mix) – 7:42
C "Whatchulookinat" (Thunderpuss Dub) – 8:43
D1 "Whatchulookinat" (Thunderpuss Tribe-A-Pella) – 6:36
D2 "Whatchulookinat" (Thunderpuss Drums) – 5:24

US 2x12"
A "Whatchulookinat" (Thunderpuss Club Mix) – 7:42
B "Whatchulookinat" (Full Intention Club Mix) – 7:00
C "Whatchulookinat" (Thunderpuss Dub) – 8:43
D1 "Whatchulookinat" (Full Intention Dub) – 6:51
D2 "Whatchulookinat" (Full Intention Old School R&B) – 3:33

European CD single
 "Whatchulookinat" (radio mix) – 3:35
 "Whatchulookinat" (P. Diddy Radio Mix) – 4:08

Europe Maxi-CD
 "Whatchulookinat" (radio mix) – 3:35
 "Whatchulookinat" (P. Diddy Radio Mix) – 4:08
 "Whatchulookinat" (Thunderpuss Club Mix) – 7:42
 "Whatchulookinat" (Full Intention Club Mix) –7:02

UK CD 1
 "Whatchulookinat" (radio mix) – 3:35
 "Whatchulookinat" (P. Diddy Radio Mix) – 4:08
 "Whatchulookinat" (Full Intention Club Mix) – 7:02

UK CD 2 (special edition)
 "Whatchulookinat" (radio edit) – 3:35
 "Love to Infinity Megamix" (Contains "I Wanna Dance with Somebody (Who Loves Me)", "So Emotional", "I'm Your Baby Tonight", "I'm Every Woman" and "It's Not Right But It's Okay") – 9:22

Personnel
Written by Whitney Houston, Andre Lewis, Tammie Harris and Jerry Muhammad
Produced by Bobby Brown and Muhammad 2G
Mixed by Kevin "KD" Davis at Zac Digital, Atlanta, GA
Lead vocals by Whitney Houston
Background vocals by Whitney Houston & Gary Houston
Vocal arrangement by Whitney Houston

Charts

Weekly charts

Year-end charts

See also
List of number-one dance singles of 2002 (U.S.)

References

External links
Whatchulookinat at Discogs

2002 singles
Whitney Houston songs
2002 songs
Arista Records singles
Songs about the media
Songs written by Whitney Houston